The national emblem of Ethiopia has been in its current form since 1996. It contains a yellow interlaced pentagram radiating rays of light on a blue shield. Today, the pentagram stands for the unity of the people and nationality of the Federal Democratic Republic of Ethiopia. The Emblem appears in the centre of the flag of Ethiopia.

Prior to 1975, the coat of arms of the Ethiopian Empire was used.

In 1975, an earlier version of the emblem of Ethiopia was adopted, consisting of a plow on a yellow sunburst surrounded by a wreath. It was used until 1987 and eventually became associated with the Dergue regime.

Colours scheme

History

See also
Flag of Ethiopia
Flags and emblems of the regions of Ethiopia

References

National symbols of Ethiopia
Ethiopia
Ethiopia